Doppio espresso is a double shot which is extracted using double the amount of ground coffee in a larger-sized portafilter basket. Doppio is Italian multiplier, meaning "double". It is commonly called a standard double, due to its standard in judging the espresso quality in barista competitions, where four single espresso are made using two double portafilters. 

A single shot of espresso, by contrast, is called a solo ("single") and was developed because it was the maximum amount of ground coffee that could practically be extracted by lever espresso machines. At most cafés outside of Italy, a doppio is the standard shot. Because solos require a smaller portafilter basket, solo shots are often produced by making ("pulling") a doppio in a two-spout portafilter and only serving one of the streams; the other stream may be discarded or used in another drink.

References

Italian drinks
Coffee drinks
Gangs in Italy